Thomas Edward Jesson (28 July 1882 – 23 July 1958) was Conservative MP for Rochdale from 1931 to 1935.

People from Rochdale
UK MPs 1931–1935
Conservative Party (UK) MPs for English constituencies
1882 births
1958 deaths
Members of the Parliament of the United Kingdom for Rochdale